Primula clevelandii, with the common name of Padre's shooting star, is a species of primrose.

Its specific epithet clevelandii honors 19th-century San Diego-based plant collector and lawyer Daniel Cleveland.

Description
Primula clevelandii is spring deciduous, dying back to the ground after the rains cease. It has basal clumps of leaves up to 40 centimeters long.

The flowers are magenta to deep lavender to white. They are nodding flowers each about an inch long on stems up to a foot tall.

This species hybridizes with Primula hendersonii, from which it can be distinguished by its green stem.

Subspecies
Named subspecies include:
Primula clevelandii ssp. clevelandii — The autonymous subspecies. In Baja California, it is found in the northwestern part of the state at low elevations from Tijuana south to El Rosario.
Primula clevelandii ssp. gracilis — Known commonly as the island shooting star. Found on the California Channel Islands and Guadalupe Island in Mexico.
Primula clevelandii ssp. insularis
Primula clevelandii ssp. patula

Distribution
The plant is native to California and Baja California. It is generally found in open grassland areas.

References

"Wildflowers of Henry W. Coe State Park" brochure, Larry Ulrich, 2002

External links
Jepson eFlora Treatment of Primula clevelandii
Calflora Database: Dodecatheon clevelandii (padre's shooting star)
Jepson Manual Treatment - Dodecatheon clevelandii
USDA Plants Profile for Dodecatheon clevelandii (padre's shooting star)
Dodecatheon clevelandii — Photo gallery

clevelandii
Flora of California
Flora of Baja California
Flora of Mexican Pacific Islands
Flora of the Sierra Nevada (United States)
Natural history of the California chaparral and woodlands
Natural history of the California Coast Ranges
Natural history of the Peninsular Ranges
Natural history of the San Francisco Bay Area
Natural history of the Santa Monica Mountains
Natural history of the Transverse Ranges
Taxa named by Edward Lee Greene
Flora without expected TNC conservation status